Michael Thomson may refer to:

Michael Thomson (footballer) (born 1961), Essendon and Richmond VFL/AFL footballer
Michael Thomson (judge), Court of Queen's Bench of Manitoba judge
Michael Thomson (journalist), Australian television presenter for Nine News
Mick Thomson (born 1973), American musician
Michael Thomson (actor), Scottish actor
Michael Thomson (cyclist) (born 1983), South African track cyclist

See also
Michael Thompson (disambiguation)